Mervyn Fonseka, OBE, KC (1897–1946) was a Sri Lankan lawyer. He was the 15th Solicitor General of Ceylon.

Educated at the Royal College, Colombo and at the Colombo Law College. He taught at briefly at Royal College before he joined the legal service as a Crown Counsel in 1928, later serving as assistant to the Attorney General. Taking up appointment as Assistant Legal Draftsman, he was later promoted to the post of Legal Draftsman and served as acting Legal Secretary on several occasions. He was appointed Solicitor General in 1943 succeeding M. W. H. de Silva. Foneska took silks as a King's Counsel that year and held the office until 1945. During his tenure he served as the acting Attorney-General.

References

External links
 Attorney General's Department

1890s births
1944 deaths
Sinhalese lawyers
F
Alumni of Royal College, Colombo
20th-century King's Counsel
Ceylonese Officers of the Order of the British Empire